Lamin Momodou Manneh was United Nations Resident Coordinator in Rwanda from 12 September 2012 to 2017. He was UN Resident Coordinator in The Republic of the Congo from 2008 to 2012.

A Gambian national, he graduated with a Master's Degree in Economics from the University of East Anglia and a post-graduate degree in Economic Policy, Investment Analysis, and Management from Harvard University in 1994.

References

Year of birth missing (living people)
Living people
Alumni of the University of East Anglia
Harvard University alumni
Gambian officials of the United Nations